The park known today as Les Orangeries of Bierbais is located in Hévillers, a section of the municipality of Mont-Saint-Guibert, located in the Wallonia in the province of Walloon Brabant in Belgium.

This part of the park, covering an area of 2.5 hectares, in the 19th century housed not only a collection of remarkable fruit and ornamental trees, but also monumental heated greenhouses of international reputation, the greenhouses of Bierbais, in the style of English gardens designed by the landscape architect Charles-Henri Petersen. Petersen lived at Bierbais until his death in 1859.

Since 2019, the two remaining orangeries have been transformed into a third place hosting residences for artists and researchers as well as cultural activities, periodically open to the public.

History

The time of gardening in the 19th century 

About forty years after Immanuel Kant introduced "the art of gardens" among the fine arts (1790), Baron De Man de Lennick, at the very moment when a wave of effervescence around this art swept through the Europe, notably France and England, has succeeded in satisfying, according to the book Temps du paysage by the philosopher Jacques Rancière. which deals with this period in the history of gardening, "an autonomous criterion of beauty by producing a specific pleasure, that which is born from the imitation of nature": "What is the amateur, Belgian or foreign, who does not know this beautiful property of Bierbais, whose turrets can be seen near the station of Mont-Saint-Guibert; this modern castle, built on an eminence in the middle of a grandiose park with secular trees".

The park was to “imitate the features exhibited by objects and beings of nature in such a way as to make them recognizable, while beautifying them; but also to imitate, by assembling these traits of visible nature, an invisible nature defined as the perfect connection of its elements into a coherent whole", which, according to the Journal d'horticulture pratique de la Belgique (1857), seems to be precisely the case: "the most beautiful grapes, strawberries and pineapples, apricots and peaches bloom and bear fruit at will and in all seasons, alongside the most beautiful representatives of the flora of Asia, America and of Africa."

In addition to the park, the greenhouses, daring in their monumental early use of iron, inaugurated on September 29, 1828, a year before Petersen finalized those of the Botanical Garden of Brussels, became famous: "Bierbais, whose greenhouses can rival those of the dukes of England and which in fact can show one of the continent's vastest collections of palms both for the quantity of the species as for the strength and the size of the trees."

Like the park, they too should not be satisfied with "reproducing the features of recognizable things", but assemble "the features borrowed from the most beautiful models into a perfect figure which mere nature does not comprise": "no such steps, point of these wooden tablets, which remove the illusion and which are the anomaly of our greenhouses. It is a real parterre, interspersed with paths, ponds and lined with artificial rocks from which springs, here and there, a jet of water from among the greenery." The qualities that refer to the natural landscape of a visible garden, as wonderful as they are, are not enough – it takes more than that, something supernatural, Edenic. In short, what is sought after, and which the park and the greenhouses of Bierbais seem to offer, "is a real paradise".

Historical descriptions of the park, the greenhouses and the collections 

At least two detailed descriptions of the park with its greenhouses remain today. The first, from 1846, was published in the journal Art de construire et gouverner les serres [Art of Building and Governing Greenhouses]:

"In Belgium, as in England, more than in France, great importance is attached to the construction of shelters which must receive plants which cannot live in the open air in temperate climates. The countless greenhouses that cover the soil of both Flanders and Brabant bear witness to this: amateur horticulturists and professional horticulturists compete in zeal on this subject. However, although the greenhouses of the latter are often erected with a certain research, they do not acquire this degree of architectural splendor or elegance that cannot be approached for merchant greenhouses, since the heads of establishments are obliged to form special greenhouses for each great family of plants which, growing in latitudes and in very varied conditions, require to be treated with care analogous to that lavished on them by nature in their homeland. But wealthy men, for whom floriculture is a relaxation and a source of lessons, not being subject to the same obligations, can raise these palaces where art is combined with the need for plants, where good taste comes in aid of the mathematical science of the builder. One of the finest models in this genre are the beautiful greenhouses of M. le Baron de Lennick, fig. 95, 96, extending over a length of nearly 430 meters.

The middle pavilion, where are enclosed full of life and health of hothouse plants having the appearance of a forest, at 13 meters 50 centimeters in elevation over a width of 10 meters, and recalls by its structure the great pavilions of the Jardin des Plantes in Paris. The pavilions serving as an orangery and the one in the middle are linked together by two temperate greenhouses. In return, there is a lower pavilion serving as a rest room, then three greenhouses for Pelargoniums, Palms and Orchids. All these greenhouses, entirely constructed of iron and glazed on all sides, with the exception of the orangeries, were erected on the designs and under the direction of Mr. Petersen, whose talent as an architect and as a gardener has grown once unveiled on Belgian soil. The culture and the beauty, even considered individually, of the myriads of plants which shelter these greenhouses, the irreproachable behavior of these, their magnificence standing out in the middle of one of the most beautiful parks that we have seen, all this property of the most richly endowed with what nature and art have that is rarest and most splendid, make this domain one of those marvels that one dares not describe for fear of remaining below reality."

The other, more detailed with regard to what this park contained in terms of species, is bequeathed to us by both the Journal d'horticulture pratique de la Belgique and The Gardener's Chronicle and Agricultural Gazette:

"The collections of Baron de Man de Lennick have a European reputation. What amateur is there, Belgian or foreign, who does not know the beautiful estate of Bierbais, the turrets of which may be seen close to the railway station of Mont-Saint-Guibert; with its modern chateau built upon an eminence in the midst of a park full of fine old trees; its magnificent conservatories and ranges of fruit-houses, where the finest Grapes, Strawberries, Pine Apples, Apricots, and Peaches, thrive and bear spontaneously, and at all seasons side by side with the most beautiful specimens of Asiatic, African and American vegetation.

The principal conservatories of Baron De Man de Lennick form a continuous parallelogram of nearly 50 yards long by 10 in height and width. The body of the building has a glazed roof, with upright sashes on the south side, and is divided into three compartments, the first of which serves as a greenhouse, and contain a collection of the rarest Conifers and other plants belonging to this class. Among them are specimens of the most beautiful species of Podocarpus and Araucaria, amongst others A. excelsa and Cunninghamii, large enough to bear cones; of exotic Pinus, Cupressus, Taxodium, and Cryptomeria, perfectly cultivated and of grand dimensions. The centre compartment contains collections of such Camellias and Azaleas as even our greatest Ghent growers might envy. Choice collections of Fuchsias, Ericas, and Sikkim Rhododendrons decorate the front decorate the front of this conservatory, the uniform appearance of which is relieved by magnificent greenhouse Palms and Tree Ferns. Extremely rare species of Chamaerops, Balantium, and Marattia, in the form of gigantic specimens, extend their long fronds above the smaller plants, which thus expand their flower beneath the shadow that plays above them. The third and easterly compartment is devoted to Orchids, and to plants which inhabit hot regions and love great heat and a damp atmosphere. But there are none of those stages or wooden boxes which destroy all effect, and are such an eyesore in our conservatories. Here we have a perfect flower garden, intersected by paths and ornamented with basins, rockwork, and jets of water, which play amongst the green verdure. This is the place in which to see Orchids, Tillandsias, Aechmeas, Heliconias, Caladiuns, Aroids, and Ferns as they really appear amidst the strange and magnificent variety of the most luxuriant vegetation of the tropics.

The collection of Orchids, although not extensive, is composed of the most beautiful genera and species, and is especially remarkable for the unequalled health and vigour of the specimens. Let us mention more particularly a Sobralia macrantha, which measured 4 feet in diameter at the base, and whose stems rose more then 2 yards high, occupying a space of 12 yards in circumference; Aërides crispum and odoratum majus; Cattleya crispa, purpurata and Mossiæ, with a Laelia superbiens, and Grammatophyllum speciosum, of uncommon vigour. Between the rocks are placed numbers of rare Orchids, now alternating with Tillandsias and Ferns, now with Caladiums, or species of Pothos and Philodendron; amongst them were most especially remarkable Cattleya Trianæi and elegans; Odontoglossum nebulosum, Pescatorei, and grande ; Coelogyne maculata and Wallichii, Saccolabium violaceum and retusum, Schomburgkia crispa and marginata; Huntleya meleagris, Vanda Batemanni, Oncidium Lanceanum, and many other striking species. Two beautiful Heliconias and a Rhopala Jonghii, 3 yards high, furnished with leaves down to the very bottom; magnificent Tree Ferns, and great numbers of plants, with either ornamental foliage or beautiful flowers, make of this place a perfect paradise."

Only two years before, in 1857, the flowering of specimens of Laelia elegans caught the attention of the : “This plant is so rare in cultivation that it has only been sent to us three times. We received the last flowers from the garden of Mr. Deman de Lennick in Bierbais in Belgium, cultivated by Mr. Keilig. According to the description, this plant must have reached an incredible perfection”.

Demolition of the greenhouses 

The collection began to be sold around July 1857. Despite their “European reputation” and their outsized dimensions, the greenhouses disappeared between the 1860s and 1880s. The precise moment and reasons for the dismantling of these greenhouses remain an enigma.

A farm-school for orphans of the 1914-1918 War 
Shortly after 1900, the Bierbais estate was bought by a certain de Streel, notary in Brussels, who was for a time mayor of Hévillers. “Having lost his two sons during the First World War, he donated the estate to the Orphan-Fund in 1918. This English organization worked to welcome and educate the many war orphans. The hundred children welcomed in Bierbais slept in the stables converted into three large dormitories. Many educational activities were developed in this ideal site: agriculture, horticulture, breeding, carpentry, sports, etc. These courses have been illustrated by numerous period postcards. »

The photos show intense activity in the various formations, as the English gardens of yesteryear have been transformed into cultivated fields.

Remodelling and repurposing 1970-2020 and onwards 

During the 1970s, the two orangeries, all that remains of the monumental greenhouses, were converted into dwellings by the architect Édouard Carlier. The east side was completely opened on its west facade in a modernist-brutalist style. Since 2020, this part of the Bierbais park, detached from the château since the late 1980s albeit still known as Les Orangeries de Bierbais, has become a third place in permaculture, welcoming artists, researchers and experimenters in residence.

Photo gallery

Bibliography

See also
Charles-Henri Petersen
Botanical Garden of Brussels
Mariemont, Belgium

References

Landscape